The Irop'a is a Korean textbook of the Japanese language published in 1492.
It is a source on the phonology of Late Middle Japanese.

The Irop'a is named in official Korean lists of textbooks for Japanese dated 1430, 1469 and 1707.
It was presumably revised after the introduction of the Hangul alphabet in 1446.
Only one copy of the Irop'a is known today, an edition printed in 1492.
This copy was in the collection of Kanbara Jinzō, president of Kagawa University, and first publicized in 1959.
It is now held by the university library.

The work begins with four forms of the Japanese syllabary, each in the order of the Iroha poem: hiragana, two forms of mana (cursive Chinese characters), and katakana.
Each hiragana syllable is accompanied by a transcription of its sound using Hangul.

The hiragana syllabary is followed by Hangul transcriptions of 16 Japanese words, represented by Chinese characters:  'capital',  'above' and the numerals 1 to 10, 100, 1000, 10,000 and 100,000,000.
The reasons for including the first two characters are unclear.
Following the syllabaries is a brief summary of the Japanese writing system, written in Chinese.
The bulk of the text is in Japanese without translation or annotation, consisting of model sentences and descriptions of Japanese people and customs.

Notes

References 

Works cited

 
 
 
 
 
 

Joseon dynasty works
Late Middle Japanese texts
15th-century books